Bert Chapman was a footballer.

Bert Chapman may also refer to:

Bert Chapman (footballer, born 1891)

See also
Herbert Chapman, English footballer
Hubert Chapman, RAF officer
Albert Chapman (disambiguation)
Robert Chapman (disambiguation)